Hostín is a municipality and village in Mělník District in the Central Bohemian Region of the Czech Republic. It has about 300 inhabitants.

References

Villages in Mělník District